Chalcides delislei, also known commonly as Delisle's wedge-snouted skink, is a species of lizard in the family Scincidae. The species is native to northern Africa.

Etymology
The specific name, delislei, is in honor of French anthropologist Fernand Delisle.

Geographic range
C. delislei is found in Algeria, Chad, Mali, Mauritania, Morocco, Niger, and Western Sahara.

Habitat

Behavior
C. delislei is diurnal, terrestrial, and fossorial.

Diet
C. delislei preys upon small beetles and their larvae.

Reproduction
C. delislei is viviparous.

References

Further reading
Boulenger GA (1887). Catalogue of the Lizards in the British Museum (Natural History). Second Edition. Volume III. Lacertidæ, Gerrhosauridæ, Scincidæ, Anelytropidæ, Dibamidæ, Chamæleontidæ. London: Trustees of the British Museum (Natural History). (Taylor and Francis, printers). xii + 575 pp. + Plates I–XL. ("Chalcides delislii [sic]", new combination, p. 407).
Lataste F (1876). "Description d'un genre nouveau et d'une espèce nouvelle de scincoidien saurophthalme ". Journal de Zoologie 5: 237–243 + Plate X. ("Allodactylus de l'Islei F. Lataste et Tremeau de Rochebrune", new species). (in French).
Padial JM (2006). "Commented distributional list of the reptiles of Mauritania (West Africa)". Graellsia 62 (2): 159–178. (Sphenops delislei, p. 167). (in English, with an abstract in Spanish).
Sindaco R, Jeremčenko VK (2008). The Reptiles of the Western Palearctic. 1. Annotated Checklist and Distributional Atlas of the Turtles, Crocodiles, Amphisbaenians and Lizards of Europe, North Africa, Middle East and Central Asia. (Monographs of the Societas Herpetologica Italica). Latina, Italy: Edizioni Belvedere. 580 pp. .
Trape J-F, Trape S, Chirio L (2012). Lézards, crocodiles et tortues d'Afrique occidentale et du Sahara. Paris: IRD Orstom. 503 pp. . (in French).

Chalcides
Skinks of Africa
Reptiles described in 1876
Taxa named by Fernand Lataste
Taxa named by Alphonse Trémeau de Rochebrune